The 1897–98 British Home Championship was the fifteenth edition of the annual football tournament played between the British Home Nations. England won the title after whitewashing all three opponents and taking the maximum six points. Scotland came second after winning two of their games whilst Ireland came third following a close victory over Wales in Llandudno.

Ireland's win over Wales was the first match of the tournament and gave Ireland a short lived advantage in the competition. England ended this advantage in the second game with a close 3–2 win over the Irish in Belfast and Scotland joined the other two on two points with a 5–2 thrashing of the Welsh. Scotland then briefly took the lead with a win over Ireland in Belfast before England joined them by beating Wales by the same scoreline in Wrexham. In the final and deciding match, played at Celtic Park in Glasgow, the Scots were defeated by a fast and powerful England side who ran out 3–1 winners and took the championship.

Table

Results

Winning squad

References

British
Home
Home
Home
British Home Championships
Brit
Brit